Dr. Lynn Elisabeth Ponton (born 3 October 1951) is a child and adolescent psychiatrist and professor at the University of California, San Francisco. She is the author of the books The Sex Lives of Teenagers and The Romance of Risk. Her work in the area of adolescent risk-taking has had a high profile at a time of newfound sexual conservatism.  Her media publications include MTV, Salon.com, 60 Minutes, and many more.

Education
1969–1973  University of Wisconsin, Madison: B.A., cum laude, biochemistry
1973–1974  Pasteur Institute, Paris, France: research assistant, biochemistry
1974–1978  University of Wisconsin, Madison: M.D., medicine
1977–1978  Maudsley and King's College Medical School
1978–1979  St. Vincent's Hospital, New York City: resident, pediatrics
1979–1980  University of Pennsylvania, Philadelphia: resident, adult psychiatry
1980–1981  University of California, San Francisco: resident, adult psychiatry
1981–1983  University of California, San Francisco: fellow, child and adolescent psychiatry
1983–1992  San Francisco Psychoanalytic Institute: psychoanalytic trainee

Faculty appointments
1994–present, professor of psychiatry, University of California, San Francisco
1988–1994, adjunct professor of psychiatry, University of California, San Francisco
1983–1988, adjunct assistant professor of psychiatry, University of California, San Francisco

Books
The Romance of Risk: Why Teenagers Do The Things They Do (1997) 
The Sex Lives of Teenagers: Revealing the Secret World of Adolescent Boys and Girls (2000) 
Handbook of Adolescent Health Risk Behavior (Issues in Clinical Child Psychology) (1996, Edited by Ralph DiClemente, William B. Hansen and Lynn E. Ponton)

See also
Adolescent sexuality
Culture wars
Adolescent psychology

External links
Lynn Ponton Website
Lynn Ponton profile at UCSF
Introductory page to "Second Opinions" advise column co-authored by Lynn Ponton
A Conversation with Lynn Ponton, New York Times

American psychiatrists
1951 births
Living people
University of Wisconsin–Madison alumni
University of California, San Francisco faculty
American women psychiatrists
21st-century American women